Orya Maqbool Jan is a Pakistani columnist, and former civil servant of BPS-21 grade. He appears currently as an analyst on Neo News television show Harf e Raaz.

Personal life
During an interview, Orya Maqbool Jan revealed that he had a love-marriage with a student at college where he used to teach.

He has one son and two daughters. All his children are foreign educated from UK and US.

Controversies

Criticisms regarding women's rights
Jan has been repeatedly criticized for being an extremist. Jan received attention in 2016 when he referred to a commercial of QMobile in which a woman wants to become cricketer as 'vulgar and provocative'. He has also said that women should not take part in political processions "because Pakistani politics are not Islamic politics and women cannot remain safe there and hence are responsible for whatever harassment they have to face in these very un-Islamic processions". When asked about Pakistani forces using captured civilian women as sex slaves he replied that raping them was permissible, saying "Well, those women are going to be raped anyway. So why not openly declare them londian and bring them home?"

Ban from Norway
In 2018, he was banned from visiting Norway for hate speech.

Books
His publications include:
 Girdbād : Balocistān ke qabā'ilī pas manẓar men̲ likhā gayā ḍrāmah, Quetta : Zumurrud  Publications, 1996, 308 p. A play on socio-cultural problems with particular reference to the Baloch tribes in Pakistan.
 Ḥarf-i rāz, Lahore : Sang-e-Meel Publications, 2005-2013, 1616 p. (in 5 volumes). Essays on deteriorating political conditions in Pakistan.
 Qāmat : shāʻirī, Lahore : Sang-e-Meel Publications, 2011, 144 p. Urdu poetry.
 Mujhe hai ḥukm-i az̲ān̲ : Z̤arb-i-muʼmin shāʼiʻ hone vāle kālam, Lahore : Ilm-o-Irfan Publishers, 2012, 336 p. Author's collected columns on various international political issues, published in weekly Z̤arb-i muʼmin Karachi during 2004-06.

References

Living people
Pakistani Islamists
Pakistani poets
Pakistani dramatists and playwrights
Critics of Ahmadiyya
Urdu-language columnists
21st-century Urdu-language writers
Pakistani civil servants
Pakistani YouTubers
1952 births